Norwood Green is a small village situated between Bradford, Halifax and Huddersfield in West Yorkshire, England. It is in the metropolitan borough of Calderdale. The village falls within the Calderdale ward of Hipperholme and Lightcliffe. It once had a railway station on the Calder Valley line.

Nightlife and entertainment 
Norwood Green has two public houses, the Olde White Bear and The Pear Tree, which host film nights and weddings. There is Judy Woods and a park. There is also a Norwood Green newsletter and village website which informs the residents of local events.

Atmosphere and residents 
Norwood Green has declined in terms of liveliness, unlike its neighbours such as Wyke and Hipperholme. Earning the nickname the 'retirement village', due to its vast population of elderly. Many experiencing the fresh countryside and lack of people, agree Norwood Green holds a 'timeless and peaceful' atmosphere, free from noise and traffic.

History 
Formerly a potential rival to Halifax, with plans to extend the village into a town, did not materialise. 'The Village of Peace', had a local shop, school and Police station, with the community spirit in full flow. Judy Woods, is the graveyard to old coal mines, dating back to pre 1900s.

See also
Listed buildings in Hipperholme and Lightcliffe

External links

Villages in West Yorkshire
Geography of Calderdale